Buchman (or Buchmann) is the surname of:

Buchman
 Alex Buchman (1911–2003), American activist
 Dana Buchman, American fashion designer
 Frank N. D. Buchman (1878–1961), Christian evangelist
 Heather Buchman, American conductor and trombonist
 M. L. Buchman, American author
 Sidney Buchman (1902–1975), film writer and producer

Buchmann
 Alexander Buchmann, Norwegian Handball player
 Christian Buchmann, Austrian politician
 Kéfera Buchmann, Brazilian Youtuber
 Emanuel Buchmann, German professional cyclist

Büchmann 
 Georg Büchmann (1822–1884), German philologist

German-language surnames
Swiss-German surnames
Swiss-language surnames
Jewish surnames